Johann Heinrich Herberger (9 November 1919  – June 2002) was a German football coach and former player.

He played for FV 1912 Wiesental, Karlsruher FC Phönix (1936–1940), Eintracht Frankfurt (1939–40), CSC 03 Kassel (01/40–1941), Blau Weiß 90 Berlin (01/42–10/42), FV Saarbrücken (01/43–06/43), 1. FC Nürnberg (07/43–1945), FC Bayern Munich (1945–46), FV Saarbrücken (1946), Karlsruher FV (1946–1947), VfB Stuttgart (1947–1949) and Stuttgarter Kickers (1948–1953).

After he ended his career, he went on to become a coach. He coached New York Hakoah in the American Soccer League (the team also competed in the International Soccer League). 
He also trained SC Geislingen/Steige (Germany, 1954), 1st German Sport Club Brooklyn (1956–1964), the Junior All-Stars New York (1960), and the team of the German-American Soccer association. During his time in the U.S. he has been called "John" instead of "Johann".

Herberger coached the United States men's national soccer team for one game in 1964.

Herberger is related to Sepp Herberger who won the 1954 World Cup, but not closely. His great-grandfather was the brother of Sepp Herberger's father.

References

External links 
 List of U.S. national team coaches
 Pictures on the website of his former Club Karlsruher FV
 

1919 births
2002 deaths
German footballers
German football managers
Karlsruher FV players
Eintracht Frankfurt players
1. FC Saarbrücken players
1. FC Nürnberg players
FC Bayern Munich footballers
VfB Stuttgart players
Stuttgarter Kickers players
United States men's national soccer team managers
German expatriates in the United States
People from Karlsruhe (district)
Sportspeople from Karlsruhe (region)
Association football midfielders
Footballers from Baden-Württemberg